Michelle van Eimeren (born 15 March 1972) is an Australian beauty queen and former actress in the Philippines.

Pageantry
She represented Australia in the 1994 Miss Universe pageant, which was held in Manila. She placed 11th overall.

Career
After her Miss Universe stint, she starred in numerous Filipino movies. She married Filipino actor/singer Ogie Alcasid in 1996 and had two children with him. She also wrote a children's book called Butterfly. She is also a commercial model and product endorser.

Personal life
She now lives in Australia with her two children, after her Legal separation from Alcasid in October 2007. In November 2009, she married her fiancé Mark Morrow in Bowral, Southern Highlands. Alcasid and his wife Regine Velasquez were among the guests.

Filmography
 Manolo en Michelle: Hapi Together (1994) as Michelle the Mermaid
 Isko (Adventures in Animasia) (1995)
 Pwera Biro Mahal Kita: D' Beachboys (1995) as Michelle
 Syempre Ikaw Lang (Ang Syota Kong Imported) (1996)

Television appearances

References

1972 births
Australian beauty pageant winners
Australian female models
Living people
Miss Universe 1994 contestants
People from Brisbane